Lorette Eugenie Adrienne Margue Charpy (born December 3, 2001) is a French artistic gymnast. She was part of the team that won silver at the 2018 European Championships and individually she is the 2019 European Games all-around silver medalist and 2019 European Championships bronze medalist on the balance beam.

Career

Junior: 2012-2016 
Charpy joined the French national team at age ten in 2012. In 2015, she was first in all-around, second on uneven bars, and third on balance beam in the junior category at French Championships.

2017 
Charpy became a senior in 2017. She won gold on uneven bars and bronze in floor exercise at the 2017 French Championships, narrowly missing the podium with fourth on balance beam and fifth in all-around.

2018 

Charpy competed at the American Cup, winning bronze on uneven bars. At French Championships, she was third all-around, first on balance beam and third in floor exercise. At the European Championships she won silver with the French team and was sixth individually on uneven bars. Charpy was injured in August 2018, fracturing her face in a fall from the uneven bars. She had surgery and missed a training camp while recovering. At the 2018 World Championships, Charpy finished sixteenth in the all-around and contributed to France's fifth place as a team.

2019
Charpy was selected to participate in the 2019 European Championships alongside Marine Boyer, Melanie de Jesus dos Santos, and Coline Devillard. In qualifications, Charpy qualified for the all-around, uneven bars, and balance beam finals with scores of 13.533 on vault, 13.933 on uneven bars, 13.266 on balance beam, and 12.433 on floor for a total of 53.165. She placed 8th in the all-around final with a score of 52.433. She finished 6th on uneven bars with a score of 14.100. For the balance beam final, she earned a score of 12.900, which earned her 3rd place, with her teammate, Melanie de Jesus dos Santos finishing just ahead of her in 2nd. The bronze medal on beam became her first individual European Championships medal at the senior level.

Charpy was selected to participate in the 2019 European Games alongside Aline Friess and Carolann Heduit. She qualified to the all-around final in 3rd place, with a score of 13.366 on vault, 14.000 on uneven bars, 13.400 on balance beam, and 12.533 on floor exercise. She finished 2nd in the all-around final, her highest all-around individual placement at a European Championships/Games competition with a score of 54.166.  She also had the highest beam score in the all-around final out of all 18 competitors with a score of 13.700.

Charpy was named to the 2019 Worlds Artistic Gymnastics Championships French team alongside Marine Boyer, Aline Friess, Melanie de Jesus dos Santos, and Claire Pontlevoy. On October 4, 2019, she competed in team qualifications on three events, earning 14.166 on uneven bars, 12.600 on balance beam, and 13.233 on floor exercise. On October 8, 2019, Charpy competed in the Team Final, helping France to a 5th-place team finish with her scores of 14.033 on bars and 12.666 on beam.

On October 30, 2019, Charpy took part in the Arthur Gander Memorial. She finished 1st place overall with her top scores being a 13.750 on vault, 13.500 on uneven bars, and 13.200 on balance beam.

2020–21 
Charpy competed at the 2020 American Cup where she finished eighth.  The remainder of the competitive season was cut short due to the global COVID-19 pandemic.  In March 2021 Charpy tore her ACL and was therefore unable to contend for a spot on France's Olympic team.

2022 
Charpy made her return to competition at the Baku World Cup where she qualified to three event finals.  She won gold on the uneven bars and silver on the balance beam behind Sarah Voss.  Additionally she placed fourth on floor exercise.

In June, Charpy competed at the Mediterranean Games, where the French team took the silver medal behind Italy. However, Charpy reinjured her knee and withdrew from the individual finals. She returned to competition in August at the European Championships, where France finished sixth in the team final. Individually, Charpy won the bronze medal on the uneven bars behind Elisabeth Seitz and Alice D'Amato. In late August, Charpy announced that she had torn her ACL for the second time.

Personal life 
Charpy's mother is a gymnastics coach. She has two sisters, Serena and Grace, who have also trained in gymnastics.

Charpy speaks English and Spanish in addition to her native French. She enjoys dancing, painting and cooking as hobbies.

Competitive History

References

External links 

 

2001 births
Living people
French female artistic gymnasts
People from Annonay
Gymnasts at the 2019 European Games
European Games medalists in gymnastics
European Games silver medalists for France
Sportspeople from Ardèche
Mediterranean Games silver medalists for France
Mediterranean Games medalists in gymnastics
Gymnasts at the 2022 Mediterranean Games
21st-century French women